Mirages (French: Mirages or Si tu m'aimes) is a 1938 French drama film directed by Alexandre Ryder and starring Arletty, Jeanne Aubert and Michel Simon.

Synopsis
It portrays the romance between a woman emerging as a star at the Folies Bergère in Paris and Pierre, an engineer who goes to work on a project in French Algeria.

Cast
 Arletty as Arlette
 Jeanne Aubert as Jeanne Dumont
 Michel Simon as Michel
 Jean-Louis Barrault as Pierre Bonvais
 Pierre Nay as Charles
 Nicole Vattier as Lucie
 Tirmont as Le ténor 
 Paul Derval as Le directeur
 Triel as Le régisseur
 Marcel Mouloudji as Groom

References

Bibliography 
 Dayna Oscherwitz & MaryEllen Higgins. The A to Z of French Cinema. Scarecrow Press, 2009.

External links 
 

1938 films
French drama films
1938 drama films
1930s French-language films
Films directed by Alexandre Ryder
Films set in Paris
Films set in Algeria
1930s French films